Le Fear is a 2010 British comedy film, and the directorial debut of actor Jason Croot who also features in a supporting role. Shot on an ultra-low budget of less than £2,000, and filmed over the course of just three days, the film stars Kyri Saphiris, Spencer Austin and Lucinda Rhodes-Flaherty, among others. The story follows the experiences of a bunch of actors as they attempt to make an ultimately inept and poor quality film. A sequel, Le Fear II: Le Sequel, is due to be released in 2016.

Plot 

A middle-aged film director realises his career is going nowhere and so takes it upon himself to finance and produce his own independent film. However, his poor casting decisions and unwilling crew turn out to be the projects downfall and his film turns into a mess.

Cast 
Kyri Saphiris as Carlos
Spencer Austin as Leon
Lucinda Rhodes-Flaherty as Debbie D
Ilona Saic as Gabby Le Fluer
Andre Sampson as Stuart
Patrick Naughton as Harry the Sparky
Fred Moss as Larry Rotchschild
Otis Samuels as Clapper AKA Tom the Clapper
Paul Knight as Dave the Vampire
Dave Wiltshire as Jim the Werewolf
Nitin Ranpura as Rav
Nick Berwick as Trevor
Jason Cook as Vincent
Meaw Davis as Pretty
Tony Resta as Jeoy Le Blanc
Jason Croot as Rasputin
Che Conroy as Susan
Sarah Lynne as Voice

Reception 

Critical reaction to the film was generally positive. Aaron Vacaro of Bad Move Nite, wrote "Le Fear is a comedy of errors that perfectly captures the absurdity of making a bad movie".  John Shatzer of Gut Munchers said "...director Jason Croot brings us a really good movie about someone making a really terrible movie. That is a really nifty bit of filmmaking.".  Paul Pritchard of Pulp Movies stated "...the people Carlos hires are an appalling collection of misfits and incompetents. This very effectively primes us for the comedy of errors that is to follow.", later saying "The film left me wanting more – much more...".

Duane L. Martin of Rogue Cinema gave a slightly less favourable review of the film, saying "the sound wasn't always the best" as well as "the visual quality of it was rather lacking". He did, however, praise the film's general concept.  Jenny Kermode, of Eye for Film was one of the few reviewers to give a more negative review of the film, awarding it only two stars out of five. She did, however, respond favourably to the low-budget nature of the film, stating "When one considers that Le Fear was made in three days on a mere £1,900, it's astounding."

References

External links 
 
 

2010 films
British independent films
2010 comedy films
Films shot at Elstree Film Studios
2010 independent films
2010s English-language films
2010s British films